Ejigbo is a prominent city in Yoruba Land and the headquarters of Ejigbo Local Government Area, one of the oldest local government areas of Osun State in Nigeria. It is part of the Ede North/Ede South/Egbedore/Ejigbo federal constituency. The population is 138,357 according to the GeoNames geographical database.

Usually, the rainy season lasts from April to October.

The postal code of the area is 232.
Ile Ilupeju, Ejigbo, Osun state.

Brief history of Ejigbo

Ejigbo is a major Yoruba city in Osun State of Nigeria.

According to oral history, Ejigbo is an ancient settlement. It was founded by Akinjole Ogiyan (abbreviation of "Ogiriniyan"), right after the old Oyo. Ogiyan has a rich pedigree, as a descendant of Oduduwa and the ruling family of Ile-Ife. Together with his brothers, particularly the Akire, the founder of Ikire-Ile, left Ile Ife with Oranya (Oranmiyan) – the founder of old Oyo,  to establish their own town. The fact that the Ogiyan is from Ile-Ife, is confirmed by "Ejigbo Mekun" the name of a market in Ile-Ife. Akinjole settled many other villages spread around Yorubaland. He was the paramount ruler and prescribed authority over many if not all of them. The following towns and villages, among others, were under him: Ika, Igbon, Olosinmo, Ologede, Inisa, Aato, Ijimoba, Afake, Ilawo, Inisa Edoro, Isundunrin, Olla, Ado Ori-Oke, Ayegunle, Idigba, Ibogunde, Songbe, Olorin, Osuntedo and Iwata.

Around 1835, Ejigbo came under Ibadan, when the Ibadan army moved to protect Osogbo from Ilorin invaders. In fact, detachments from Ejigbo assisted the Ibadan army in the Osogbo, Ijaye, Jalumi, Off, and Kiriji wars between 1840 and 1866. Ajayi Ogboriefon, Balogun and leader of the Ibadan army in the Jalumi war circa 1860 and 1878 was native of Ejigbo from the Akala compound. His mother, Alagbabi, was the daughter of an Ogiyan of Ejigbo.  In 1934, when the then government returned to the terms of the 1893 Treaty, which recognized Ibadan's independence and gazettes of the Baale and Divisional Council of Ibadan as an Independent Native Authority, five district obas, including the Ogiyan, were made members of the divisional Council.

The Ogiyan and council were also gazetted as subordinated to Native Authority under Ibadan for Ejigbo District Council. Although changes were made enlarging the membership of the Council between 1937 and 1938, the five districts Obas that included the Ogiyan retained their membership of the said Divisional Native Authority.

Ejigbo people

Travelling
Ejigbo indigenes are well traveled. They have long history of international emigration, predominantly Ivory Coast, formerly known as Côte d'Ivoire, and have created border-less ECOWAS.  Out of about a million and two hundred thousand Nigerians residing in Côte d'Ivoire since the 1900s till present, indigenes of the Ejigbo local government area made up of more than 50% of that population. This has been drastically affecting the population of Ejigbo city, Nigeria, due to continuous migration of her people to some neighbouring West African countries, notably: Benin Republic, Burkina Faso, Côte d'Ivoire, Ghana, Liberia, Niger Republic, and Togo. The international exposure of Ejigbo people is evident in Ejigbo city.

Wherever Ejigbo people are found, they live a communal lifestyle. This is done in order to maintain the unity and cordial relationship they enjoy before travelling out of the country. They are believed to be so established and organized in each big city and town in which they find themselves. For example, in Côte d'Ivoire, the Ejigbo people have a community leader they refer to as "Oba" of that area, such as 'Oba Bouake', 'Oba Abobo', 'Oba Dabou', 'Oba Grand Bassam', 'Oba Treichville' (etc.), while the 'Oba' who resides in Adjame, suburb of Abidjan, is called the "Oba Abidjan". He is regarded as the paramount Ejigbo community leader of Côte d'Ivoire. These ‘Oba’ performs an intermediary role between the government and his subjects. He is deemed to be the custodian of the migrants who fall within their jurisdiction. The 'Obas' also help new migrant, once they could speak a native language, to process the Ivorian permanent residence permit (card identete). All those so-designated Ejigbo community leaders are all recognized back at home by HRM, the Ogiyan of Ejigbo.

Languages
Apart from Ejigbo peoples' mother tongue (Yoruba language) and Nigeria's official language (English), some of the other foreign languages spoken today in Ejigbo include: French (second to Yoruba), Dioula (Mali), Eve (Togo), and Asante (Ghana). In Ejigbo today, along the street, few people have been speaking English. They speak and transact in French instead, because they are part and parcel of the Francophone world. The Ejigbo people are found in both West African and European Francophone cities.

International personalities
Descendants of Ejigbo people have the opportunity of having dual-nationality in every Francophone country where they dwell. In Côte d'Ivoire, for example, they are found in local and national administrative positions, such as inspector of education, health administration and local government councils. The case of Togo is unique. Ejigbo descendants born in Togo before 1991 are fully integrated and have full citizenship. Among them are the twin brothers Tidjani; while one was the Chief of Army Staff of late General Ghansimgbe Eyadema (former Togolese President who ruled for up to 40 years), the second brother was the rector of the only federal university. He is currently an economic adviser to the government of Togo (the twin brothers have Ejigbo royal family tribal marks). The parents of the Togolese international footballer, Adebayor and that of the Ivorian No.1 featherweight boxer as at 1986/87, Wahabi Spider, are from Ejigbo.

Cultural heritage

Ogiyan Festival
The festival of Orisa Ogiyan is still the most spectacular annual event in the city. During the festival, the Ogiyan, the ruler of the city is confined to his home for three months. The Orisa Ogiyan festival is held at the beginning of the harvest of new yams, usually in the rainy season. The Orisa is fed with new yam and epo pupa (palm oil).  An important aspect of the festival is Ewo, the practice in which the people of the city divide themselves into two groups: the Isale Osolo and the Oke Mapo. They face each other in daylong whipping fights, as though in real battle.

The origin of this tradition centers on a medicine-man, or an Ifa Priest, who, in Owonri Elejigbo and Ifa divination verse, is known as "Sawoleje". The man helped the town in time of crisis. He was caught sleeping with the wife of an Ogiyan, and was severely beaten almost to death. He then cursed the town's people, saying that unless they regularly beat themselves as they had beaten him, the city would face some calamity.  The tradition goes that there must be fights in every festival, otherwise, the city would not be at peace, and the health of its people would be endangered. Ejigbo in recent times, now remains one of the most peaceful of Yoruba towns; tradition says Ejigbo is never overtaken by war. The festival has now turned into an annual carnival.

Farming

Farming is the traditional source of economy in Ejigbo. It is based on production of food crops, such as tubers (yam, cassava, cocoyam,
potato, etc.), grains (maize, guinea corn), and cowpea; cash crops like cocoa, palm oil, kola-nut, coconut and varieties of fruits which include large production of pineapple.

In the ancient times, the women helped in harvesting and selling of farm produce in the local markets. In some cases, such as palm oil, they engage in processing by extracting oil and the kernels from their shells. The land on which they farm is tropical dry forest and savanna, which has not been very much useful in the cultivation of cash crops, like cocoa and others in large quantities, as compared to other forested parts of Yoruba land.  Kolanut is grown, but not in any large quantity. The farmlands are not very far from the town; therefore the people have always been urban dwellers.

Modernization has taken farming activities in Ejigbo to a world level. There are large poultry, fisheries and animal husbandry farms (Ogidiolu Farms, Worgor Farms, etc.) in Ejigbo. In 2008, Ejigbo was ranked highest producer of life cat fish in Osun State. Mechanized palm-oil processing plants has taken the place of the manual methods, and land cultivation has been greatly improved.

Economic activities
The central traditional market, popularly known as "Oja Ejigbo", is located at the center of the city, in the front of palace. The market is fixed for every Saturday(occasionally on thursday), as is the case in many Yoruba towns, and attracts merchants from all over Ejigbo city. There are also a handful of other such markets. Due to the commercial/agrarian nature of the town, the market is also the most favored for night shopping and other social activities. In the past, it was used as recreational center for the town, and therefore was attended by many who even had nothing to buy or sell.

More so, modern commercial banks and micro-finance banks have become available in the town.

Religion activities
Ejigbo did not escape the influence, especially in the nineteenth century, of events that permeated Nigeria. Its people and culture change with the flow.  For example, many people have been converted to Christianity and Islam. The Baptist, being the dominant Christian mission in the town, now has a number of churches, and it was through its efforts that the people of the town established the first full-fledged secondary Grammar School, the Ejigbo Baptist High School, followed by the Ansar Ud Deen Grammar School. Ejigbo is tolerant of its diverse faiths. This is demonstrated in the joint celebration of the annual Orisa Ogiyan festival and other inter-religious and inter-denominational programs.

Educational facilities
The readily available and affordable educational facilities have placed Ejigbo and her inhabitants among the well-educated in the country. All levels of Nigerian educational facilities have been available in Ejigbo. These have ranged from well-equipped kindergartens, nursery schools, primary schools, secondary and grammar schools and tertiary institutions. Osun State University College of Agriculture is located at Ejigbo. A lot of other tertiary institutions in the southwest operate distance learning centers at Ejigbo.

References

External links

Local Government Areas in Osun State
Towns in Yorubaland